Route 161 is a state highway in southeastern Connecticut, running from the shoreline village of Niantic in East Lyme to the village of Chesterfield in Montville.

Route description
Route 161 begins as Pennsylvania Avenue at an intersection with Route 156 in the village of Niantic in East Lyme. Route 161 continues north for another  until it reaches the interchange with I-95 (at exit 74). After crossing under I-95, it continues for another  to the Boston Post Road US 1 in the village of Flanders, where it becomes Chesterfield Road. In this area, one can access East Lyme High School and the Flanders Shopping Plaza from Route 161. The road continues north through the northeastern portion of the town of East Lyme for  before entering the town of Montville, where the road name changes to Flanders Road. The road turns northeast for another  to end at an intersection with Route 85 in the village of Chesterfield.

History
The Niantic-Flanders-Chesterfield road was a primary state highway in the 1920s known as Highway 188. In the 1932 state highway renumbering, Route 161 was created from the northern half of old Highway 188, running from US 1 in Flanders to Route 85 in Chesterfield.  In 1950, Route 161 was extended south to Niantic along former SR 669. At an unconfirmed time after 1965, a section near East Pattagansett Road in East Lyme was rerouted for safety reasons.

Junction list

References

External links

161
Transportation in New London County, Connecticut